"I Got Soul" is a song performed by American R&B singer Eamon issued as the third single from his 2017 studio album Golden Rail Motel. The song was produced by Eamon and Dan Ubick of Connie Price and the Keystones and co-produced by Stoupe from Jedi Mind Tricks. Vocal production was handled by Los Angeles-based record producer Snipe Young.

The song lashes out against mass marketing and individualism, while suggesting that there are deeper, more worthwhile things to possess than money and luxury items.

Music video
The official music video for “I Got Soul” was directed by Douglas Quill, who had previously worked with Eamon on R.A. the Rugged Man’s “Still Get Through the Day”, a song Eamon was featured on. The music video for "I Got Soul" is a one-shot, also known as a "one-take" or "oner". It was shot over one night in August 2017 in the Antelope Valley, a desert-like setting on the outskirts of L.A. County.

In June 2017, Eamon approached Quill about shooting a music video that takes place at a "Golden Rail Motel", the concept behind his album of the same title. Quill went on to write a treatment that features Eamon returning to a seedy, 1970's-style motel, following him from room to room, greeting his fellow "down on their luck" residents as he performs the song.

Personnel

Eamon – lead vocals, backing vocals
Jake Najor – drums
Dave Wilder – bass
Connie Price – percussion
Dan Ubick – guitars
Chandler S. Dandridge – Wurlitzer
Benj Heard – piano
D'Wayne Kelly – Hammond organ
Jordan Katz – trumpet
David Ralicke – tenor saxophone

Horn arrangements by Dan Ubick and Eamon
All music recorded at The Lion's Den in Topanga Canyon, California
All vocals recorded at The Space Ship in Los Angeles, California
Mixing and additional production by Steve Kaye at SunKing Studios
Mastered by Dave Cooley at Elysian Masters

References

External links
Lyrics

2017 songs
2017 singles
Eamon (singer) songs